“Shah Ismayil” – is an Azerbaijani mugham opera in 6 acts and 7 scenes composed by Muslim Magomayev, in 1915-1919. Libretto and text were written by Mirza Gadir Ismayilzade basing on a legend about young Shah Ismayil. 

Premiere of the opera was held in March 1919 in Baku, with a benefit performance of Huseyngulu Sarabski (Rzayev). Muslim Magomayev was conductor and Huseyn Arablinski (Khalafov) was director of the opera. Actors such as H.Sarabski (Shah Ismayil), M.H.Teregulov (Aslan Shah) and Huseynagha Hajibababeyov (Gulzar) played parts in the opera. 

The second edition was created in 1924. Premiere was held on December 3, 1924 in Baku, at Azerbaijan State Academic Drama Theatre. Muslim Magomayev was its conductor and A.A.Tuganov director. Huseyngulu Sarabski (Shah Ismayil), M.H.Teregulov (Aslan Shah) and Khurshid Qajar (Gulzar) acted the parts. On November 20, 1929 the opera was again staged in Baku. And again Muslim Magomayev was its conductor. Abbas Mirza Sharifzadeh was the director and S.S.Serejin and V.V.Roberg were art directors of the opera. H.A.Hajibababeyov (Shah Ismayil) and Khurshid Qajar (Gulzar) acted the main parts.  

In 1930, the third edition of the opera was written. Its premiere was held in Baku, in 1947. Ahad Israfilzade was conductor of the opera.

Characters

References

Video
Watch the opera "Shah Ismail"  site  YouTube
The grandson Muslim Magomayev - Aria of Aslanshah from the opera "Shah Ismayil" site  YouTube 

Azerbaijani music
Azerbaijani-language operas
1919 operas
Operas based on literature
Operas
Operas set in Iran